WDYH-LD, virtual channel 27 (UHF digital channel 32), was a low-powered Cheddar-affiliated television station licensed to Augusta, Georgia, United States.

History 
The station's construction permit was issued on Oct. 17, 2013 under the calls of W27DY-D and changed to the call sign WDYH-LD.

The station's license was surrendered by HC2 Holdings to the Federal Communications Commission and cancelled on December 15, 2020.

Digital channels

References

External links

Low-power television stations in the United States
Innovate Corp.
Television stations in Georgia (U.S. state)
Television channels and stations established in 2015
2015 establishments in Georgia (U.S. state)
Television channels and stations disestablished in 2020
2020 disestablishments in Georgia (U.S. state)
Defunct television stations in the United States